Jari Kaarlo Torkki (born August 11, 1965, in Rauma, Finland) is a retired professional ice hockey player who played in the National Hockey League and SM-liiga. He also won a silver medal at the 1988 Olympics with Team Finland.

Career
Jari Torkki played his entire SM-liiga career for Lukko, a team located in Rauma, Finland. Torkki along with Erik Hämäläinen has an iconic status in Lukko and is held in high regard by Lukko fans.

Despite having a good form in SM-liiga, Torkki did not have a great career in NHL. Torkki played two seasons in North America and played for the Chicago Blackhawks of the NHL. Torkki also played for IHL teams Saginaw Hawks and Indianapolis Ice during his two-season tenure in North America.

After his short NHL visit, Torkki returned to Lukko and played 6 more seasons for Lukko, totaling 13 seasons in Lukko.

After playing for Lukko, Torkki to play for Star Bulls Rosenheim, of DEL, HC Merano and HC Milano of Italian Serie A and finally, Bracknell Bees of the British Ice Hockey Superleague (BISL).

Jari Torkki was also an Olympian as a member of Finland's team who took home Silver in Calgary 1988.

Jari Torkki retired in 2003.

Career statistics

Regular season and playoffs

International

External links 

1965 births
Living people
Chicago Blackhawks draft picks
Chicago Blackhawks players
Finnish ice hockey right wingers
Ice hockey players at the 1988 Winter Olympics
Indianapolis Ice players
Lukko players
Olympic ice hockey players of Finland
Olympic medalists in ice hockey
Olympic silver medalists for Finland
People from Rauma, Finland
Saginaw Hawks players
Sportspeople from Satakunta